Lynneeker Nakamuta Paes de Albuquerque (born 11 January 1994 in Lapa) is a Brazilian professional footballer who plays as a forward for Desportivo Brasil.

On 8 July 2015, Lynneeker signed with Marítimo.

References

External links

Lynneeker at Footballdatabase
Lynneeker at ZeroZero

1994 births
Living people
Brazilian footballers
Brazilian expatriate footballers
Cruzeiro Esporte Clube players
ABC Futebol Clube players
C.S. Marítimo players
Flamurtari Vlorë players
Hidd SCC players
Capivariano Futebol Clube players
Desportivo Brasil players
Primeira Liga players
Kategoria Superiore players
Bahraini Premier League players
Brazilian expatriate sportspeople in Portugal
Brazilian expatriate sportspeople in Albania
Brazilian expatriate sportspeople in Bahrain
Expatriate footballers in Portugal
Expatriate footballers in Albania
Expatriate footballers in Bahrain
Association football forwards